Manfred Kern (born 13 February 1964) is an Austrian former international footballer.

References

1964 births
Living people
Association football midfielders
Austrian footballers
Austria international footballers
Austrian Football Bundesliga players
FC Admira Wacker Mödling players
SK Rapid Wien players
FK Austria Wien players
LASK players
Footballers from Vienna